O Daryeon (O Da-ryeon; 856–944) was a nobleman in the Later Kingdom of Unified Silla who became the father of Queen Janghwa and the father in-law of Wang Geon, Goryeo dynasty's founder, also the maternal grandfather of Hyejong of Goryeo.

In popular culture
Portrayed by Lee Il-woong in the 2000-2002 KBS1 TV series Taejo Wang Geon.

References

오다련 吳多憐 on CultureContent .

856 births
944 deaths
10th-century Korean people
9th-century Korean people
Silla people